84th Division or 84th Infantry Division may refer to:

 84th Infantry Division (German Empire) 
 84th Infantry Division (Wehrmacht)
  (France)
 84th Division (United States) 
 84th Division (Imperial Japanese Army)
 84th Infantry Division (Russian Empire)
 84th Rifle Division (Soviet Union)
 84th Guards Rifle Division (Soviet Union)

See also
 84th Wing (disambiguation)
 84th Regiment (disambiguation)
 84th Squadron (disambiguation)